"It's My Life" is a song by American rock band Bon Jovi. It was released on May 8, 2000, as the lead single from their seventh studio album, Crush (2000). It was written by Jon Bon Jovi, Richie Sambora, and Max Martin, and co-produced by Luke Ebbin. The song peaked at number one in Austria, Flanders, Italy, the Netherlands, Portugal, Romania, Spain, and Switzerland while charting within the top 10 across several other countries and peaking at number 33 on the US Billboard Hot 100. "It's My Life" is Bon Jovi's most well-known post-1980s hit single and helped introduce the band to a new, younger fanbase.

Background
The song has many classic Bon Jovi features, such as Sambora's use of the talk box, and a line in the second verse "For Tommy and Gina, who never backed down" refers to Tommy and Gina, a fictional working class couple that Bon Jovi and Sambora first wrote about in their 1986 hit "Livin' on a Prayer".

"It's My Life" is also notable for its line referencing fellow New Jerseyan Frank Sinatra: "My heart is like an open highway / Like Frankie said / I did it 'My Way'." Jon Bon Jovi and Richie Sambora apparently had a disagreement over those lines, with Bon Jovi recalling:

In Paul Anka's cover of the song for his 2005 album Rock Swings, he sings the second line as "Frankie said he did it my way", since Anka wrote the English lyrics for "My Way".

Response from fans
"Nobody had anticipated the song 'It's My Life'," noted Jon Bon Jovi in 2007. "Except us. We knew we had a hit." The song became an anthem that appealed to many fans. As Bon Jovi later stated: "I thought I was writing very self-indulgently about my own life and where I was in it. I didn't realize that the phrase 'It's My Life' would be taken as being about everyone – by teenagers, by older guys, mechanics, whatever. 'It's my life, and I'm taking control.' Everyone kind of feels that way from time to time."

Music video
The music video was directed by Wayne Isham. Will Estes (as Tommy) and Shiri Appleby (as Gina) are the two main characters. At the beginning, Tommy is watching a video of a Bon Jovi concert on his computer when he is ordered by his mother to take out the trash. Suddenly, Gina calls and tells him to immediately come to the tunnel as the live concert has already started. Tommy starts running down to his apartment and obediently takes out the trash. He then runs through the streets of Los Angeles up to the concert, getting chased by dogs, running a marathon, posing for pictures, and jackknifing a truck. The video was inspired by the film Run Lola Run. Jon Bon Jovi met Estes on the set of U-571 and chose him to be in the video. The music video features the 2nd Street Tunnel as one of the main settings.

It is the most viewed video for Bon Jovi on YouTube, reaching 1 billion views by the end of June 2021.

Live performances
The song has been performed live at almost all of Bon Jovi's shows since its release and is considered a "setlist staple", one of only a select few songs released after the 1980s in their discography to hold this distinction. As of 2023, it has been played over 850 times.

Track listings

US 7-inch single
A. "It's My Life"
B. "Next 100 Years"

Australian maxi-CD single
 "It's My Life"
 "Hush" (demo version)
 "You Can't Lose at Love" (demo)
 "I Don't Want to Live Forever" (demo)
 "Someday I'll Be Saturday Night" (enhanced video clip)
 "Someday" was recorded live by Tony Bongiovi at the Sanctuary II, New Jersey Web Concert on February 10, 2000

UK CD1
 "It's My Life"
 "Hush" (demo version)
 "You Can't Lose at Love" (demo version)
 Includes poster

UK CD2
 "It's My Life" (Dave Bascombe mix)
 "Temptation" (demo version)
 "I Don't Want to Live Forever" (demo version)
 "It's My Life" (enhanced video)

European CD single
 "It's My Life"
 "Hush" (demo version)

European enhanced CD single
 "It's My Life"
 "Hush" (demo version)
 "You Can't Lose at Love" (demo version)
 "Someday I'll Be Saturday Night" (live)
 "Someday" was recorded live by Tony Bongiovi at the Sanctuary II, New Jersey Web Concert on February 10, 2000

Acoustic version
A much slower, acoustic ballad version of the song is featured on Bon Jovi's 2003 album This Left Feels Right, a collection of their greatest hits that were adapted into new formats. This version was also released as a single. A live performance was uploaded to YouTube in May 2020.

Awards
Won:
"Video of the Year" at the VH1 My Music Awards
Chosen as one of the greatest songs of the year at the ASCAP Pop Music Awards
Nominated:
"Best Rock Performance by a Duo or Group with Vocal" at the 43rd Grammy Awards, but lost to U2's "Beautiful Day"

Charts

Weekly charts

Year-end charts

Decade-end charts

Certifications

Release history

See also
 List of number-one hits of 2000 (Austria)
 List of Dutch Top 40 number-one singles of 2000
 List of number-one hits of 2000 (Italy)
 List of number-one singles of 2000 (Spain)
 List of Romanian Top 100 number ones of the 2000s
 List of number-one singles of the 2000s (Switzerland)

Notes

References

External links
 Bon Jovi — Official Website.

2000 songs
2000 singles
Bon Jovi songs
Dutch Top 40 number-one singles
European Hot 100 Singles number-one singles
Island Records singles
Mercury Records singles
Number-one singles in Austria
Number-one singles in Italy
Number-one singles in Portugal
Number-one singles in Romania
Number-one singles in Spain
Number-one singles in Switzerland
Music videos directed by Wayne Isham
Song recordings produced by Max Martin
Songs written by Jon Bon Jovi
Songs written by Max Martin
Songs written by Richie Sambora
Ultratop 50 Singles (Flanders) number-one singles